S/O Satyamurthy is the soundtrack album composed by Devi Sri Prasad for the 2015 Indian Telugu-language film of the same name, directed by Trivikram Srinivas. The film stars Allu Arjun, Samantha Ruth Prabhu, Nithya Menen and Adah Sharma in the lead roles. Devi Sri Prasad has also composed the background score for the film. The album consists of seven songs in Telugu, with Sri Mani, Devi Sri Prasad, Sirivennela Seetharama Sastry and Ramajogayya Sastry penning the lyrics. "Super Machi" is the most popular track among the all. For the soundtrack album, Devi received two awards, out of five nominations.

Production and release 
Trivikram's regular collaborator, Devi Sri Prasad, was hired for the music compostions. Folk singer Raghu Dixit made his Telugu cinema debut as a playback singer, saying on 4 February 2015 that he had recorded a song for the film. The soundtrack was scheduled to be released on 18 March, with Pawan Kalyan and Mahesh Babu the expected guests of honour at the release party. In late February 2015, Prasad wrote and recorded a song. Aditya Music acquired the soundtrack's marketing rights, and the seven-track list was released on 20 March 2015. The complete album was released the following day, on 21 March 2015, coinciding with the Ugadi celebrations, on the H. I. C. C. Novotel Hotel in Hyderabad. Kannada tracks of the film were released in 2020, including soundtrack album under Aditya Music label.

Track listing

Reception 
The soundtrack's success was celebrated on 6 April 2015 at Haailand, Vijayawada.

Critical reception 
IndiaGlitz gave the soundtrack 3.25 out of five stars, calling it "electrifying" and "different offering in part, not totally". Oneindia gave it three out of five stars, selecting "Seethakalam", "Come to the Party" and "Super Machi" as the film's best songs. Jeevi of Idlebrain.com praised Devi's background score composition. News18 too lauded Devi's work for the album.

A critic of The Times of India wrote that "On the whole, the songs in the album are passable. It does have the trademark style of Devi Sri Prasad, although he doesn't hit the ball out of the park with his work." Behindwoods gave the soundtrack 2.75 out of five stars, calling it typical of the commercially successful Arjun-Srinivas-Prasad team and low in experimentation.

Awards and nominations

Legacy 
Super Machi (2022), is an upcoming film featuring Kalyaan Dhev and Rachita Ram, and directed by Puli Vasu. The title of the film is adapted from the "Super Machi" track of the album.

References

Telugu film soundtracks
Filmi soundtracks
2015 soundtrack albums
Devi Sri Prasad soundtracks
Aditya Music soundtracks
Drama film soundtracks
Action film soundtracks
Romance film soundtracks
Comedy film soundtracks